MercyMe, It's Christmas is the second Christmas album by MercyMe, released on October 9, 2015, through Fair Trade Services. The album was produced by Brown Bannister and Ben Shive.

Critical reception

Awarding the album four stars at CCM Magazine, Andy Argyrakis states, "there’s basically something for everyone on one of this season’s most inviting." Christopher Smith, rating the album four stars from Jesus Freak Hideout, writes, "MercyMe, It's Christmas! is a huge success and sets a high bar for the rest of the Christmas releases this year. Though you might not be ready for it, it is a spectacular addition to any Christmas music collection." Giving the album four and a half stars for New Release Today, Caitlin Lassiter says, "It's Christmas is certainly a success as far as Christmas records go and is sure to be the soundtrack to many holiday festivities in homes around the country this season."

Allocating the album a nine out of ten for Cross Rhythms, Brendan O'Regan writes, "Mind you they might also be moved to dance by the pacey numbers." Joshua Andre, indicating in a four star review by 365 Days of Inspiring Media, says, "MercyMe have crafted a fine effort". Assigning the album nine stars out of ten at The Front Row Report, Reggie Edwards responds, "MercyMe have outdone themselves". Sarah Baylor, signaling in a 4.8 out of five review from The Christian Beat, replies, "MercyMe has managed to create a brilliant Christmas album that contains their own unique, spirit-filled sound."

Track listing

Personnel 

MercyMe
 Bart Millard – lead vocals, backing vocals, arrangements 
 Barry Graul – guitars, backing vocals, arrangements
 Mike Scheuchzer – guitars, backing vocals, arrangements
 Nathan Cochran – bass, backing vocals, arrangements
 Robby Shaffer – drums, arrangements

Additional Musicians
 Ben Shive – acoustic piano, keyboards, Hammond B3 organ, programming, arrangements, horn arrangements, string arrangements 
 Mark Douthit – saxophones 
 Barry Green – trombone 
 Mike Haynes – trumpet 
 Keith Smith – trumpet, arrangements
 Carol Neuen-Rabinowitz – cello 
 Monisa Angell – viola 
 Kristin Wilkinson – viola 
 David Angell – violin
 Janet Darnall – violin
 David Davidson – violin
 Brown Bannister – arrangements

Production 
 Brown Bannister – producer, overdub recording 
 Ben Shive – producer, overdub recording
 Buckley Miller – engineer 
 Joe Pisapia – engineer 
 Crystal Burks – assistant engineer 
 Aaron Chafin – assistant engineer 
 Jordan Logue – assistant engineer
 Shane D. Wilson – mixing 
 Lani Crump – mix coordinator 
 Kyle Cummings – digital editing 
 Ted Jensen – mastering at Sterling Sound (New York City, New York).
 Brody Harper – art direction, design 
 Dana Salsedo – art direction
 Eric Brown – photography

Chart performance

References

MercyMe albums
Christmas albums by American artists
2015 Christmas albums
Pop rock Christmas albums